In Panama, a corregimiento is a subdivision of a district, which in turn is a subdivision of a province. It is the smallest administrative division level in the country; which is further subdivided into populated places/centres. As of 2012, Panama is subdivided into a total of 693 corregimientos, since several of these were created in the province of Bocas del Toro and the indigenous region (comarca indígena) of Ngäbe-Buglé.

List of corregimientos by province and district

Province of Bocas del Toro

Province of Chiriquí

Province of Coclé

Province of Colón

Province of Darién

Province of Herrera

Province of Los Santos

Province of Panamá

Province of Panamá Oeste

Province of Veraguas

Comarca Emberá-Wounaan

Comarca Guna Yala

Comarca Ngäbe-Buglé

References

External links
Population and area by province, comarca and corregimiento (1990-2010)

 
Geography of Panama
Subdivisions of Panama
Panama 3
Villages, Panama